is a Japanese professional baseball outfielder for the Hiroshima Toyo Carp of Nippon Professional Baseball (NPB). He previously played in Major League Baseball (MLB) for the Cincinnati Reds and in Nippon Professional Baseball for the Saitama Seibu Lions.

Career

Saitama Seibu Lions

Saitama Seibu Lions selected him with the third selection in the 2010 NPB draft.

In 2015, Akiyama set the NPB record for hits in a single season with 216, surpassing the 214 collected by Matt Murton of the Hanshin Tigers in 2010. He also batted a career-best .359 average for the year. In 2017, he led the NPB with a .322 average. Over the last 5 seasons of his career in NPB (2015–2019), Akiyama batted a .321 average and appeared in 5 consecutive NPB All-Star games.

On October 29, 2019, Akiyama held a press conference to announce that he had filed for free agency for the rights to play overseas in Major League Baseball (MLB).

Cincinnati Reds

On January 6, 2020, Akiyama signed a 3-year, $21 million contract with the Cincinnati Reds. On July 24, 2020, Akiyama made his MLB debut. During the pandemic-shortened 2020 season, Akiyama hit .245/.357/.297 and made no defensive errors in 54 games. He was released by the Reds on April 5, 2022.

San Diego Padres
On April 30, 2022, Akiyama signed a minor league deal with the San Diego Padres. On May 9 he was assigned to the El Paso Chihuahuas, the Triple-A affiliate of the Padres. On June 16 he was released by El Paso.

Hiroshima Toyo Carp
On June 27, 2022,  Akiyama signed a three-year contract with the Hiroshima Toyo Carp.

International career
Akiyama represented the Japan national baseball team in the 2012 exhibition games against Cuba, 2013 exhibition games against Chinese Taipei, 2015 WBSC Premier12, 2016 exhibition games against Chinese Taipei, 2016 exhibition games against Mexico and Netherlands, 2017 World Baseball Classic and 2018 MLB Japan All-Star Series.

On October 1, 2019, Akiyama was selected to the 2019 WBSC Premier12. But on October 31, he broke his right toe due to a hit by pitch (HBP) in a practice game with Canada, and he withdrew from the 2019 WBSC Premier12.

See also
 List of Major League Baseball players from Japan

References

External links

Shogo Akiyama at NPB.com

1988 births
Living people
Baseball people from Kanagawa Prefecture
Cincinnati Reds players
Japanese expatriate baseball players in the United States
Major League Baseball outfielders
Major League Baseball players from Japan
National baseball team players
Nippon Professional Baseball outfielders
Saitama Seibu Lions players
Hiroshima Toyo Carp players
2015 WBSC Premier12 players
2017 World Baseball Classic players
Louisville Bats players
El Paso Chihuahuas players